Sayran may refer to:

Sayran Lake, Almaty
Sayran (Almaty Metro)
Sayran bus station

See also
Sayran Ban, border crossing on Iran–Iraq border